Philip Glenn Whalen (October 20, 1923 – June 26, 2002) was an American poet, Zen Buddhist, and a key figure in the San Francisco Renaissance and close to the Beat generation.

Biography
Born in Portland, Oregon, Whalen grew up in The Dalles from age four until he returned to Portland in 1941. He served in the US Army Air Forces during World War II. He attended Reed College on the GI Bill.   There, he met Gary Snyder and Lew Welch, and graduated with a BA in 1951. He read at the famous Six Gallery reading in 1955 that marked the launch of the West Coast Beats into the public eye. He appears, in barely fictionalized form, as the character "Warren Coughlin" in Jack Kerouac's The Dharma Bums, which includes an account of that reading. In Big Sur he is called "Ben Fagan". Whalen's poetry was featured in Donald Allen's anthology The New American Poetry 1945-1960.

Whalen's first interest in Eastern religions centered on Vedanta.  Upon release from the army in 1946, he visited the Vedanta Society in Portland, but did not pursue this very far, because of the expense of attending their countryside ashram.  Tibetan Buddhism also attracted him, but he found it "unnecessarily complicated."  In 1952, Gary Snyder lent him books on Zen by D. T. Suzuki. With Snyder, Whalen attended a study group at the Jōdo Shinshū Buddhist Church in Berkeley. Ultimately, Zen became his chosen path.

Whalen spent 1966 and 1967 in Kyoto, Japan, assisted by a grant from the American Academy of Arts and Letters and a job teaching English. There, he practiced zazen daily, and wrote some forty poems and a second novel.

He moved into the San Francisco Zen Center and became a student of Zentatsu Richard Baker in 1972.  The following year, he became a monk.  He became head monk of Dharma Sangha, in Santa Fe, New Mexico in 1984.  In 1987, he received transmission from Baker, and in 1991, he returned to San Francisco to lead the Hartford Street Zen Center until ill health forced him to retire.

Poetry 
 The Calendar, a Book of Poems. Reed College, thesis (B.A.), Portland, Ore. 1951.
 Self Portrait from Another Direction. (Broadside), Auerhahn Press, San Francisco 1959.
 Memoirs of an Interglacial Age. Auerhahn Press, San Francisco 1960.
 Like I Say. Totem Press/Corinth Books, New York 1960
 Monday in the Evening, 21:VII:61. Pezzoli, Milan 1964
 Every Day. Coyote's Journal, Eugene, Oregon 1965
 Highgrade: Doodles, Poems. Coyote's Journal, San Francisco 1966
 On Bear's Head. Harcourt, Brace & World/Coyote, New York 1969
 Scenes of Life at the Capital. Maya, San Francisco 1970
 Enough Said: Fluctuat Nec Mergitur: Poems 1974-1979. Grey Fox Press, San Francisco 1980.
 Heavy Breathing: Poems 1967-1980. Grey Fox Press, San Francisco 1983
 Canoeing up Cabarga Creek: Buddhist Poems 1955-1986. Parallax Press, Berkeley 1996.
 Overtime: Selected Poems by Philip Whalen. Penguin, New York 1999.
 The Collected Poems of Philip Whalen. Wesleyan University Press, Middletown, Connecticut 2007.
Both the Collected and Selected Poems were edited by Michael Rothenberg.

Prose 
 You Didn't Even Try. Coyote, San Francisco 1967. (novel)
 Imaginary Speeches for a Brazen Head. Black Sparrow Press, Los Angeles 1972. (novel)
 Off the Wall: Interviews with Philip Whalen. Donald Allen, editor. Grey Fox Press, Bolinas, California 1978.
 The Diamond Noodle. Poltroon Press, Berkeley 1980. (memoirs)
 Winning His Way, or, the Rise of William Johnson: a diverting history for the instruction & improvement of the breed.  Free Print Shop, San Francisco, California, 1983.
 Two Novels. Zephyr Press, Somerville, Mass. 1985.
 Goof Book (for Jack Kerouac). Big Bridge Press, Guerneville, Calif. 2001. (journal)

See also

Timeline of Zen Buddhism in the United States

Notes

References

Charters, Ann (ed.). The Portable Beat Reader. Penguin Books. New York. 1992.  (hc);  (pbk)
Suiter, John. Poets on the Peaks (2002) Counterpoint. ;  (pbk)

Further reading 
 David Schneider. Crowded by Beauty: The Life and Zen of Poet Philip Whalen. University of California Press, Berkeley, 2015.

External links

 Philip Whalen Papers at the Rare Book & Manuscript Library at Columbia University
Whalen homepage at the EPC
Tributes and poem
Essay on Whalen
Whalen chapbook at Big Bridge
Whalen's hand-drawn fable "The Invention of the Letter"
Guide to the Philip Whalen Papers at The Bancroft Library
Transcription of extensive biographical interview with Phillip Whalen by David Meltzer, Jacket Magazine
Records of Philip Whalen are held by Simon Fraser University's Special Collections and Rare Books

American Zen Buddhists
Poets from Oregon
Beat Generation writers
Converts to Buddhism
Writers from Portland, Oregon
Writers from Santa Fe, New Mexico
People from The Dalles, Oregon
Reed College alumni
San Francisco Zen Center
Zen Buddhist monks
1923 births
2002 deaths
20th-century American poets
Religious leaders from the San Francisco Bay Area
Writers from San Francisco
American Book Award winners
United States Army Air Forces personnel of World War II
20th-century Buddhist monks